LoveRealm  is a Christian social networking platform. It was founded by two triplet brothers and medical doctors Yaw Ansong Jr. and Yaw Ansong Sr. The company originates from Accra, Ghana, and has employees from Europe and the US. The social network entered beta in 2016.

The website has systems in place such as a mentorship system where users are assigned to mentors whose role is to guide and assist them in personal growth. Additionally, users can post their problems and share “prayer requests” to other members.

History 
LoveRealm was started by the triplet brothers after Yaw Ansong Jr. came to believe that there was a need for a Christian online network where individuals could support each other and share their belief in a protected space.

"I was at a point in my life where I was at my lowest; and I realized that I had struggles and weaknesses and all this started when I found myself in an environment outside my country where there was not many Christians. I thought to myself if Christians could connect to each other wherever they are and also have a platform where they could encourage each other then it could go a long way to help them," said Dr. Ansong to Deutsche Welle. 

The pre-launch ceremony of the social network website was held at the Pentecost Convention Centre during the Pentecost Students Association (PENSA) conference on 9 January 2016. At the pre-launch ceremony, the founders collected feedback from randomly selected test users before releasing the website to the public. After initial target of a few hundred test users, the website crashed due to the huge interest. Later the issue was fixed by adding space for 2000 more initial users.

On 30 August 2016, the social networking company launched a mobile version of their website for Android users in Google Play Store. Shortly after the mobile app launch, it reached over 20,000 users.
Eight months after opening access to the public, the platform reached 50,000 users.

Controversies 
On 4 January 2016, BBC published a story explaining that Ghana was to get a sin-free alternative to Facebook. LoveRealm responded by saying that the network was providing a spiritual social network experience for Christians and not to build a salem of righteous people.

The platform ensures faith-based content by censoring and removing “un-Christian content”, such as nudity or violence, with its built-in monitoring algorithm system.

References

External links 
 Official website

Christian websites
Ghanaian social networking websites
Establishments in Ghana